J1, J01, J.I, J-I or J-1 may refer to:

Vehicles

Aircraft
 AEG J.I, a World War I German ground attack aircraft
 Albatros J.I, a 1917 German ground-attack single-engine biplane aircraft
 Junkers J 1, a 1916 German aircraft
 Junkers J.I, a 1917 German aircraft
 Lawrance J-1, an early 1920s engine used in American aircraft

Locomotives
 LB&SCR J1 class, a British LB&SCR locomotive
 LNER Class J1, a class of British steam locomotives
 PRR J1, an American PRR steam locomotive

Other vehicles
 J-I rocket, a Japanese solid rocket expendable launch vehicle
 J1 type submarine, a World War II Imperial Japanese Navy cruiser submarines class
 HMS J1, a 1915 World War I British submarine
 JAC J1, a subcompact car
 Al Fahd 300 (J-1), an Iraqi surface-to-surface missile project

In arts and entertainment
 J-1 World Heavyweight Championship, a professional wrestling competition
 J1 World Tour, a concert tour by Taiwanese singer Jolin Tsai
 J1 Live Concert, a 2005 live album by Taiwanese singer Jolin Tsai
 "J1" (song), a 2008 song by Mallu Magalhães
 J.I the Prince of N.Y, American rapper also known as J.I.

In mathematics and science
 ATC code J01, Antibacterials for systemic use, a subgroup of the Anatomical Therapeutic Chemical Classification System
 Haplogroup J1 (Y-DNA), a Y-DNA haplogroup
 Janko group J1, in mathematics
 S/2003 J 1, a former name for Eukelade, a satellite of Jupiter
 First-order Bessel function of the first kind, denoted 
 J01, the ICD-10 code for acute sinusitis, a medical condition
 J1, the Johnson solid notation for an equilateral square pyramid

Other uses
 J-1 visa, a type of U.S. visa for exchange visitors
 The J1 League, the top division of Japanese association football
 Samsung Galaxy J1, a smartphone
 J1, abbreviation, reference to the director staff of the Joint Chiefs of Staff

See also
1J (disambiguation)